The Territorial Prelature of São Félix (do Araguaia) is a Roman Catholic territorial prelature in the Brazilian state of Mato Grosso.

It is a suffragan in the Ecclesiastical province of the Metropolitan of Archbishop of Cuiabá. Its cathedral see, Catedral Prelatícia Nossa Senhora da Assunção, is located in the city of São Félix do Araguaia.

On 21 March 2012, Pope Benedict XVI appointed as the Prelate of São Félix Bishop Adriano Ciocca Vasino, who had previously served as the Bishop of the Roman Catholic Diocese of Floresta in Pernambuco.

History 
 On 13 May 1969, the Territorial Prelature of São Félix was established from the Territorial Prelature of Cristalândia, the Territorial Prelature of Registro do Araguaia (later promoted to Diocese of Guiratinga and suppressed) and the Territorial Prelature of Santíssima Conceição do Araguaia (later renamed Marabá and promoted to a suffragan diocese).

Leadership 
 Bishop Pere Casaldàliga i Pla, C.M.F. (27 August 1971 – 2 February 2005)
 Bishop Leonardo Ulrich Steiner, O.F.M. (2 February 2005 – 21 September 2011), appointed Auxiliary Bishop of Brasilia
 Apostolic Administrator: Bishop Eugène Lambert Adrian Rixen of Goiás (21 September 2011 – 21 March 2012)
 Bishop Adriano Ciocca Vasino (21 March 2012 – present)

References

External links
 GCatholic.org, with more extensive prelate biographies
 Catholic Hierarchy
 Pelature website 

Roman Catholic dioceses in Brazil
Christian organizations established in 1969
São Félix, Territorial Prelature of
Roman Catholic dioceses and prelatures established in the 20th century
Territorial prelatures